Kikhonda is an administrative ward in the Mkalama District of the Singida Region of Tanzania. According to the 2012 census, the ward had a total population of 7,519.

References

Wards of Singida Region